Zhu Mo (1 September 1380 – 11 June 1431) was a prince of the Ming dynasty. He was the 21st son of the Hongwu Emperor. He was the granted the titile of Prince of Shen (瀋王).

Family 
Consorts and Issue:
 Princess consort of Shen, of the Zhang clan (瀋王妃 张氏;d.1406), daughter of Zhang Wenjie (张文傑)
 Lady, of the Zhang clan (章氏; d. 1451)
 Zhu Jiabao, Prince Kang of Shen (瀋康王 朱佶焞; 7 December 1407 – 7 October  1457), first son
 Lady, of the Wu clan (吴氏)
 Zhu Jikui, Prince Kangsu of Lingchun (陵川康肅王 朱佶煃), second son
 Zhu Jiyun, Prince Daohuai of Qinshu (沁水悼懷王 朱佶熅), sixth son
 Lady, of the Xi clan (席氏)
 Zhu Jiwei, Prince Xijing of Pingyao (平遙僖靖王 朱佶煟), third son
 Lady, of the Pang clan (庞氏)
 Zhu Jijuan, Prince Daojing of Jishan (稷山悼靖王 朱佶焆), fifth son
 Unknown
 Zhu Jiyu, Prince Zhaoxi of Lincheng (黎城昭僖王 朱佶燏), fourth son
 Zhu Jitong (朱佶炵), seventh son
 Zhu Jifu, Prince Gongding of Qinyuan (沁源恭定王 朱佶㷆), eight son
 First daughter
 Princess Hunyuan (浑源郡主), second daughter
 Princess Yicheng (翼城郡主), third daughter
 Fourth daughter
 Princess Hejing (河津郡主), fifth daughter
 Princess Jiexiu (介休郡主), sixth daughter

Ancestry

See also 
 List of vassals prince peerages of Ming dynasty

References 

 
 

1380 births
1431 deaths
Ming dynasty imperial princes
Sons of emperors